Getting It may refer to:

 Getting It: The Psychology of est, a 1976 non-fiction book by Sheridan Fenwick
 Getting It, a 2006 novel by Alex Sánchez